The following highways are numbered 527:

Canada
Alberta Highway 527
 Ontario Highway 527

India
 National Highway 527 (India)

Ireland 

  R527 road (Ireland)

United Kingdom 

  A527 road

United States
 
 
 
 
 
 
 
https://en.wikipedia.org/wiki/County_Route_527_(New_Jersey)